Malvern railway station is a commuter railway station on the southern border of Malvern, a suburb of Melbourne, Victoria, Australia. The station is listed on the Victorian Heritage Register, and was opened on 7 May 1879. The station consists of an island platform and two side platforms all accessed by a pedestrian bridge. There are two principal station buildings located on the central platform (platforms 2 and 3) and on platform 4, consisting of a small two and one-story brick buildings. These buildings were provided in 1914, as ticketing and staff offices. The station is only partially accessible due to a multiple steep access ramps.

Malvern railway station is served by the Frankston line, with limited services on the Pakenham and Cranbourne lines, which are part of the Melbourne railway network. The station also connects to route 16 and 64 tram services.

Description 
Malvern railway station is on the boundary of Malvern and Caulfield North, suburbs of Melbourne, Victoria. East of the station is Glenferrie Road and south of the station is Dandenong Road. The station is located nearby to the Glenferrie Road shopping precinct, Malvern Central Shopping Centre, and the future Malvern Collective apartment building. The station is owned by VicTrack, a state government agency, and the station is operated by Metro Trains. The adjacent stations are Armadale station up towards Melbourne, and Caulfield station down towards Dandenong or Frankston.

The station consists of a single island platform and two side platforms with a total of four platform edges. Standard in Melbourne, the platform has an asphalt surface with concrete on the edges. The platforms are approximately 160 metres (524.93 Ft) long, enough for a Metro Trains 7 car HCMT. The station features a pedestrian bridge, accessed from the centre of the platforms by a ramp. The station features two principal station buildings, both former ticketing offices which are now heritage listed staff facilities. Distinct Edwardian architectural features of the two red brick station buildings include ornate parapets, cement banding, tall chimneys with terracotta pots, tiled hip roof with terracotta finials, and stucco walls. The signal box was constructed in 1915 and is also of made of red brick with the original fittings retained in the room.

The station building, platform, and overpass are largely the same as when originally built, with the main change being updated signage, technology, and the addition of two new platform canopies amongst other minor building and platform upgrades. There is no car parking available at the station. The station is listed as an "assisted access" station on the Metro Trains website, as the access ramp is too steep and would require assistance for wheelchair customers to traverse.

History

Malvern railway station was opened on 7 May 1879 with the station consisting of a single platform and track for commuter and freight service. Like the suburb itself, the station was named after the Malvern Hill Estate. The housing lots within the estate were sold by barrister Charles Skinner in 1856, who named the estate after the Malvern Hills in Herefordshire, England. The first station buildings were opened on the site between 1881 and 1883 to coincide with the duplication of track between the city and Oakleigh. The current station was constructed in 1914 to provide improved and additional facilities to what had become an increasingly busy and important location on the train network. The station rebuild was part of level crossing removal works that removed all level crossings, rebuilt all stations, and quadruplicated the corridor between South Yarra and Caulfield by 1914. Later in 1922, the line was electrified using 1500 V DC overhead wires with three position signalling also introduced.

The station has mostly stayed the same since 1914, with only minor upgrades taking place. In 1988, the former electrified goods yard were removed. This platform had been used for cargo and postal deliveries during its operational life, however was decommissioned after the reduction in use. In 1993, major re-signalling works occurred between Toorak and Caulfield stations. The station underwent minor upgrades with the installation of new shelters on Platform 1 in the 2010s. In September 2021, High Capacity Metro Trains used on the Pakenham and Cranbourne lines were certified to stop at platforms 3 and 4 only.

In 2015, Stonnington Council rezoned land surrounding the station to allow for higher density residential and commercial development.

Platforms and services
Malvern has two side platforms and one island platform with four faces. The station is currently served by Pakenham, Cranbourne, and Frankston line trains—all on the metropolitan railway network. The Pakenham line runs between Pakenham station and Flinders Street station via the City Loop. Similarly, the Cranbourne line also follows a similar route joining the Pakenham line at Dandenong before continuing to the city. Due to low patronage, the Cranbourne and Pakenham lines only stop at the station during off-peak periods. The Frankston line runs from Frankston station south east of Melbourne, joining the Cranbourne and Pakenham lines at Caulfield station before continuing onto the Werribee or Williamstown lines via Flinders Street station. From 2025, the Pakenham and Cranbourne lines will run via the Metro Tunnel before continuing onto the Sunbury line to Sunbury.

Platform 1:
  stopping all stations and limited stop services to Flinders Street, Werribee and Williamstown.

Platform 2:
  stopping all stations and limited express services to Frankston.

Platform 3:
  off-peak express services to Flinders Street.
  off-peak express services to Flinders Street.

Platform 4:
  off-peak stopping all stations services to Pakenham.
  off-peak stopping all stations services to Cranbourne.

From 2025, the Pakenham and Cranbourne lines will be connected to the Sunbury line via the Metro Tunnel. From 2029, the lines will also be connected to the Melbourne Airport rail link.

Transport links
Malvern station has two tram connections with no bus connections. The route 16 tram service operates from nearby Glenferrie Road up towards the city and down towards Kew. The route 64 tram service operates from nearby Dandenong Road up towards the city and down towards East Brighton. The station has an accessible platform tram stop for routes 16 and 64 on adjacent Dandenong road. The Route 16 stop outside the station isn't wheelchair accessible. Instead, this stop is operated through an on-street tram stop. Malvern station also has train replacement bus stops located adjacent to the station.

Tram connections:
 : Melbourne University – Kew
 : Melbourne University – East Brighton

References

External links
Public Transport Victoria

Heritage-listed buildings in Melbourne
Listed railway stations in Australia
Railway stations in Australia opened in 1879
Railway stations in Melbourne
Railway stations in the City of Stonnington